Aleksandr Aleksandrovich Fyodorov (born 15 May 1965) is a former Russian football player.

References

1965 births
Living people
Soviet footballers
Russian footballers
FC Zhemchuzhina Sochi players
Russian Premier League players
Perlis FA players
Russian expatriate footballers
Russian expatriate sportspeople in Malaysia
Expatriate footballers in Malaysia
FC Sibir Novosibirsk players
Association football defenders
FC Dynamo Vologda players
FC Lokomotiv Saint Petersburg players